Gellibrand is a surname. For its etymology, see Gillibrand, of which Gellibrand is a variant. Around 2016, thirteen people in Great Britain bore the name, and none in Ireland. At the 1881 census of Great Britain, twelve people bore the name, located predominantly in London.

Notable people with the surname include:

 Henry Gellibrand (1597–1637), English mathematician
 Samuel Gellibrand (1614–1675), English bookseller
 John Gellibrand (1872–1945), Australian military officer and politician
 Joseph Gellibrand (1792–1837), Australian jurist
 Paula Gellibrand (1898–1986), English female model and writer
 Walter Gellibrand (1832–1909), Australian politician

References